Adetaptera is a genus of beetles in the family Cerambycidae, most of which were formerly in the genus Parmenonta.

Species
 Adetaptera albisetosa (Bates, 1880)
 Adetaptera albosticta (Galileo & Martins, 2003)
 Adetaptera chapadensis (Martins & Galileo, 1999)
 Adetaptera dominicana (Galileo & Martins, 2004)
 Adetaptera fulvosticta (Bates, 1885)
 Adetaptera insularis (Fisher, 1930)
 Adetaptera laevepunctata (Breuning, 1940)
 Adetaptera lenticula (Galileo & Martins, 2006)
 Adetaptera maculata (Martins & Galileo, 1999)
 Adetaptera minor (Bates, 1880)
 Adetaptera ovatula (Bates, 1880)
 Adetaptera parallela (Lameere, 1893)
 Adetaptera punctigera (Germar, 1824)
 Adetaptera schaffneri Santos-Silva, Nascimento & Wappes, 2019
 Adetaptera strandiella (Breuning, 1940)
 Adetaptera thomasi (Linsley & Chemsak, 1984)
 Adetaptera wickhami (Schaeffer, 1908)

References

Apomecynini
Cerambycidae genera